In Greek mythology, Nisus may refer to the following personages:
 Nisus or Silenus, foster father of Dionysus.
 Nisos, a king of Megara and father of Scylla.
 Nisus, son of Hyrtacus, and lover and friend of Euryalus, in Virgil's Aeneid. He participated in the games held by Aeneas in Sicily. Nisus later died in battle.
 Nisus, king of Dulichium and son of Aretias. He was the father of Amphinomus, one of the Suitors of Penelope.

Notes

References 

 Apollodorus, The Library with an English Translation by Sir James George Frazer, F.B.A., F.R.S. in 2 Volumes, Cambridge, MA, Harvard University Press; London, William Heinemann Ltd. 1921. ISBN 0-674-99135-4. Online version at the Perseus Digital Library. Greek text available from the same website.
 Homer, The Odyssey with an English Translation by A.T. Murray, Ph.D. in two volumes. Cambridge, MA., Harvard University Press; London, William Heinemann, Ltd. 1919. . Online version at the Perseus Digital Library. Greek text available from the same website.
 Publius Vergilius Maro, Aeneid. Theodore C. Williams. trans. Boston. Houghton Mifflin Co. 1910. Online version at the Perseus Digital Library.
 Publius Vergilius Maro, Bucolics, Aeneid, and Georgics. J. B. Greenough. Boston. Ginn & Co. 1900. Latin text available at the Perseus Digital Library.

Characters in Greek mythology